Zvi Yisrael Thau (born 1938) is a Religious Zionist rabbi, a disciple of Rabbi Zvi Yehuda Kook, and co-founder and president of Yeshivat Har Hamor in Jerusalem.

Biography
Hans (Zvi Yisrael) Thau was born in Vienna to Galician Jews parents. His father, Avraham Adolph Thau, was a banker, and his mother, Judith Yutah Meisels, was a chemist. After the annexation of Austria to Nazi Germany ("Anschluss"), the family left for the Netherlands, and during the Holocaust, they were hidden by a local family in Hilversum. They were saved, among other things, due to his mother's resourcefulness.

His sister Eveline related: "In June 1943, there was a large Aktion [round-up of Jews to be deported], and we were saved thanks to our mother, who was a chemist. She managed to disguise us as measles patients and hung a sign on the door: 'Beware. Contagious disease'."

After the war, Thau studied in a public school, where he was exposed to philosophy. At the age of 17, after his mother's death, he immigrated to Israel, despite his father's objections, due to his refusal to complete a matriculation certificate prior to immigration. His father and sister visited the United States during this period.

After making aliyah, Thau studied at Yeshivat HaDarom under Rabbi Yehuda Amital. He related that Rabbi Amital introduced him into the world of Torah and the teachings of Rabbi Abraham Isaac Kook. The following year, Thau studied at  Mercaz HaRav in Jerusalem.

Thau's first wife, Chana, died in 2004. She was a pioneer of Torah study for women in the Orthodox community. At the age of 71, Thau married Batya Cohen, founder and clinical director of an outpatient clinic treating modern Orthodox and Haredi sufferers of eating disorders.

Thau has three sons and a daughter. His eldest son, Rabbi Mordechai (Moti), heads the yeshiva high school "Shalom Banayich" in Jerusalem. His son Rabbi Nehemiah is a lecturer in the yeshiva in Mitzpe Ramon. Thau has two older sisters: Dr. Gerda Elata-Alster, a former professor of Comparative Literature at Ben-Gurion University; and Dr. Eveline Goodman-Thau, a professor of Jewish religious and intellectual history, who served one year as a liberal rabbi in Vienna.

Rabbinical career
From the 1960s, Thau held a position of influence at Yeshivat Mercaz HaRav. He is considered by many to be the leading disciple of Rabbi Zvi Yehuda Kook, the dean of Mercaz HaRav.

In 1997, Thau opposed the introduction of an academic framework – plans to integrate a teaching institute – into Mercaz HaRav. As a result, he, together with six senior lecturers and many students, left the yeshiva and established the Har Hamor yeshiva. (The name "HaMoR" is also a Hebrew acronym for "Successor to Mercaz HaRav".) While he is not involved in Har Hamor's day-to-day management, Thau is the ultimate authority on ideological matters.

While Thau's authority on matters of ideology and policy amongst those affiliated with the movement associated with the right flank of Dati Leumi Israeli Jewry has remained unquestioned for many years, Rabbi Amiel Sternberg, the current dean of the Har Hamor yeshiva, is credited with positing that Rabbi Thau was mistaken in defending Chaim Walder, a Charedi psychologist and best-selling author convicted in religious court of sexual misconduct; he did not immediately retract his comments after criticizing Rabbi and noted rabbinical judge Shmuel Eliyahu and meeting with him to "smooth things over".

Views and opinions
Thau objects to the "Bible at Eye Level" (תנך בגובה עיניים) approach, which interprets Biblical narratives and personalities as real-life situations and real-life characters  (see ).

With regard to religious soldiers ordered to evacuate a settlement, he ruled that explicit refusal was out of the question, but soldiers would need to make it clear to their commanding officers that they "were incapable" of carrying out such an order.

Thau is the ideological leader of the Noam party, a far-right religious Zionist party in Israel whose key issue is the promotion of heteronormative, anti-LGBTQ, and traditionalist policy. Leading up to the 2021 Israeli legislative election, he told followers "these homosexuals, these perverts, are miserable people. We want the voice of truth and the voice of faith and the voice of Torah to sound, and for someone there to cry out all the time… someone who will not rest until this thing is off the agenda."

Allegations of sexual assault
In 2022, Israeli police opened an investigation against Thau following multiple accusations of sexual assault. One woman said that Thau had repeatedly assaulted her over 30 years, beginning when she was a minor. Soon after, another woman accused Thau of raping her after she immigrated to Israel and became close with the Thaus. Thau has not responded to the allegations. In the past, Thau had supported public figures accused of sexual assault, such as Moshe Katsav and Chaim Walder.

Published works
Books based on his lectures:

Le-Emunat Iteinu – 13 volumes of lectures on faith and redemption
 Tzaddik Be-Emunato Yichye – on Torah study
 Solu Hamesila – on the struggle for the Land of Israel
 Neshama Le-Am Aleha – lectures given during the 2005 Israeli disengagement from Gaza
 Nosei Alumotav  – on the value of agriculture
 Tzedakah Teromem Goy – on the value of the mitzvah of charity
 Hesed uMishpat Ashira – regarding love of God and accepting suffering with love

References

1937 births
Living people
Israeli Orthodox Jews
Religious Zionist Orthodox rabbis
Mercaz HaRav alumni
Israeli Orthodox rabbis
Chardal
Austrian emigrants to Israel
Jewish emigrants from Austria after the Anschluss
Israeli people of Polish-Jewish descent